Johny Joseph with the stage name Kundara Johny is an Indian actor in Malayalam cinema. He has also done Tamil films like Vaazhkai Chakram and Nadigan.

Early life
He made his debut, at the age of 23, through the 1979 Malayalam movie, Nithya Vasantham, playing a 55-year-old character.

Personal life
He is married to Stella, a Hindi professor at Fatima Mata National College, Kollam.

Filmography

Malayalam

Tamil

Telugu

Kannada

Television

References

External links

 Johnny at MSI

Indian male film actors
Male actors from Kollam
Male actors in Malayalam cinema
20th-century Indian male actors
21st-century Indian male actors
Male actors in Tamil cinema
Male actors in Kannada cinema
Male actors in Telugu cinema
Living people
Year of birth missing (living people)